William West Ross (October 5, 1893 – December 22, 1964), nicknamed "Nacogdoches", was an American Negro league pitcher from 1922 to 1930.

A native of Corrigan, Texas, Ross made his Negro leagues debut in 1922 with the Indianapolis ABCs. He went on to play for the Washington Potomacs, St. Louis Stars, Detroit Stars, and Cleveland Tigers before finishing his career with the Homestead Grays in 1929 and 1930. Ross died in Diboll, Texas in 1964 at age 71.

References

External links
 and Baseball-Reference Black Baseball stats and Seamheads

1893 births
1964 deaths
Cleveland Tigers (baseball) players
Detroit Stars players
Homestead Grays players
Indianapolis ABCs players
St. Louis Stars (baseball) players
20th-century African-American sportspeople
Baseball pitchers